FMGM Monarchs Hockey Club are a Men's and Women's hockey club based in Dundee, Scotland. They play and train at Dalnacraig Sports Centre, Dundee.

Monarchs won their first National Title in 2012: National League Division 4 indoor - with a record of played 10, won 8, one draw and one defeat. They finished the league 11 points clear of Glasgow Uni in 2nd place.

History
Monarchs are an amalgamation of five "old" hockey clubs, who over time found it difficult to exist in their own right so came together to form Monarchs.

The constituent clubs are:

Forfar Hockey Club
Morgan Academy FP's Men's Hockey Club
Grove Academy FP's Men's Hockey Club
Dundee High School FP's Men's Hockey Club
Monifieth High School FP's Men's Hockey Club

Teams
Monarchs, in season 2017/2018, have the following playing teams

Men's 1st Team - play in the Scottish Hockey Union National League Division 3, Indoor National League Division 3 and Midland Indoor League Division 1.

Men's 2nd Team - play in the Midland Hockey Union Division 1 and Midland Indoor Division 2.Men's Development Team - play in the Midland Hockey Union Division 2 and in Midland Indoor Division 3.

Women's 1st Team - play in Midland outdoor league in division 2. They also compete in the Midland ladies indoor league with teams in both division 1 & 2.

Sport in Angus, Scotland
Scottish field hockey clubs